Hubbard Springs is an unincorporated community in Lee County, Virginia, in the United States.

History
A post office was established at Hubbard Springs in 1892, and remained in operation until it was discontinued in 1955. The community was named for Eli Hubbard, an early landowner.

References

Unincorporated communities in Lee County, Virginia
Unincorporated communities in Virginia